Delphine Aurore Delrue (born 6 November 1998) is a French badminton player. Delrue started playing badminton at aged seven, and she affiliate with the USEE Badminton club in 2006. Delrue was selected to join the national team in INSEP in 2016. In 2015, she became the runner-up of European University Championships in the women's doubles and mixed doubles events. In 2016, she won French National Badminton Championships in the women's doubles event with her partner Léa Palermo. She also the runner-up at the Orléans International in the women's doubles event and Swiss International in the mixed doubles event. In 2017, she became the runner-up at the Estonian International partnered with Léa Palermo. She competed at the 2018 Mediterranean Games, clinched the women's doubles gold with Palermo. In 2019, she captured a bronze medal at the European Games in the mixed doubles event with Thom Gicquel. Delrue and Gicquel reached a career high as world number 10 in the BWF World ranking in 9 March 2021. She competed at the 2020 Summer Olympics.

Achievements

European Games 
Mixed doubles

European Championships 
Mixed doubles

Mediterranean Games 
Women's doubles

BWF World Tour (2 titles, 5 runners-up) 
The BWF World Tour, which was announced on 19 March 2017 and implemented in 2018, is a series of elite badminton tournaments sanctioned by the Badminton World Federation (BWF). The BWF World Tour is divided into levels of World Tour Finals, Super 1000, Super 750, Super 500, Super 300 (part of the HSBC World Tour), and the BWF Tour Super 100.

Women's doubles

Mixed doubles

BWF International Challenge/Series (5 titles, 9 runners-up) 
Women's doubles

Mixed doubles

  BWF International Challenge tournament
  BWF International Series tournament
  BWF Future Series tournament

References

External links 
 
 
 

1998 births
Living people
French female badminton players
Badminton players at the 2020 Summer Olympics
Olympic badminton players of France
Competitors at the 2018 Mediterranean Games
Mediterranean Games gold medalists for France
Mediterranean Games medalists in badminton
Badminton players at the 2019 European Games
European Games bronze medalists for France
European Games medalists in badminton
21st-century French women